Synodontis dekimpei is a species of upside-down catfish endemic to Guinea. It is only known from the Konkouré River where mining is causing the degradation of its habitat. This species grows to a length of  SL.

References

dekimpei
Catfish of Africa
Freshwater fish of West Africa
Endemic fauna of Guinea
Fish described in 1987